Tsam Chuk Wan is a bay of the Sai Kung Peninsula in Hong Kong. By extension, it is also the name of the area around the bay. Tsam Chuk Wan Village is one of the villages located within this area.

History
A Catholic missionary station was established at Tsam Chuk Wan between 1867 and 1869.

In 1911, Pak Tam Chung consisted of six villages with fewer than 405 inhabitants in total: Wong Yi Chau, Pak Tam, Sheung Yiu, Tsak Yue Wu, Wong Keng Tei and Tsam Chuk Wan. The six villages were all inhabited by Hakka people, with the exception of two hamlets in Pak Tam.

The population of Tsam Chuk Wan Village was 74 in 1911. In the 1950s, it was about 55, as recorded by Austin Coates and James W. Hayes.

Islands
Islands of Tsam Chuk Wan include:
 Muk Yue Chau
 Ching Chau
 Nga Ying Chau
 Wong Nai Chau Tsai
 Wong Yi Chau

Features
Features around the bay include (from West to East):
 Memorial Monument of Sai Kung Martyrs of World War II. Unveiled on January 23, 1989.
 Hong Kong Sea Cadet Corps Tang Shiu Kin Nautical Centre
 Queen Elizabeth School Camp
 Tsam Chuk Wan Village, a recognized village under the New Territories Small House Policy.
 Wong Keng Tei Tin Hau Temple aka. Tsam Chuk Wan Tin Hau Temple. Located off Tai Mong Tsai Road, and overlooking Tsam Chuk Wan
 Wong Keng Tei, a village
 Po Leung Kuk Pak Tam Chung Camp
 Sheung Yiu Folk Museum, housed in Sheung Yiu Village, a declared monument of Hong Kong
 Our Lady of the Seven Sorrows Chapel. Built in 1900, it is one of the historic churches of Sai Kung.
 Wong Yi Chau, a village

See also
 Port Shelter
 List of planning areas in Hong Kong
 Sai Kung East Country Park
 Sai Kung West Country Park

References

External links

 Delineation of area of existing village Tsam Chuk Wan (Sai Kung) for election of resident representative (2019 to 2022)

Bays of Hong Kong
Sai Kung Peninsula
Sai Kung District